Bedrooms is a 2010 drama film directed and written by Youssef Delara. Starring Julie Benz, Moon Bloodgood, Sarah Clarke, Xander Berkeley, Dee Wallace and Barry Bostwick. It premieres August 20, 2010 at the Los Angeles Latino Film Festival 2010.

Plot
Bedrooms is about the exploration of relationships between humans, the tough choices we have to face to see them work or need to move on and the complications. Julian and Beth are a married couple at the vital turning point of their young relationship. In another, Anna and Harry are a married couple who are suffering from infidelity, while Sal [a pizza delivery boy] unwittingly becomes the ultimate reason of their conflict. Marnie and Roger are a retired couple who have had a long but unusual relationship together. Janet is a divorced mother of ten-year-old twins who decide to create their own separate spaces in the room they share by building a wall out of all their toys.

Cast
 Dylan Sprayberry as Max
 Julie Benz as Anna
 Moon Bloodgood as Beth
 Sarah Clarke as Janet
 Xander Berkeley as Harry
 Dee Wallace as Marnie
 Barry Bostwick as Roger
 Jordan Belfi as Julian
 Jesse Garcia as Sal
 Enn Reitel as Walter
 Ellery Sprayberry as Daisy
 Maury Rogow as John

References

External links
 
 
 

2010 films
2010 drama films
American drama films
2010s English-language films
2010s American films